Komorica can refer to one of the following:

 Komorica, a village in Požega-Slavonia County, Croatia
 Komorica, an Adriatic Sea island in Šibenik-Knin County, Croatia